The Flower Girl from the Grand Hotel (German: Das Blumenmädchen vom Grand-Hotel) is a 1934 German drama film directed by Carl Boese and starring Elsa Merlini, Georg Alexander and Hans Brausewetter. The film's sets were designed by the art directors Gustav A. Knauer and Alexander Mügge. A separate Italian-language version The Lucky Diamond was also produced starring Merlini with a different supporting cast.

Synopsis
A flower girl working at a grand hotel encounters a diamond that brings her luck and adventure.

Cast
 Elsa Merlini as 	Lis
 Georg Alexander as Eduard Swalt
 Hans Brausewetter as 	Fritz Peters
 Fritz Odemar as 	Der Diener Hermann
 Julius Falkenstein as 	Hoppe, Taxichauffeur
 Hans Richter as 	Tommy, ein Straßenjunge
 Jakob Tiedtke as 	Flindt, Theaterdirektor
 Theo Lingen as 	Thumser, Spielleiter
 Alfred Beierle as 	Putzke, Besitzer eines Warenhauses
 Hans Hemes as 	Brösicke, Rayonschef
 Annie Markart as 	Gaby, Revuestar 
 Heinz Lingen as 	Ballett
 Erich Fiedler	
 Werner Finck

References

Bibliography
 Cardullo, Bert. Screening the Stage: Studies in Cinedramatic Art. Peter Lang, 2006.
 Klaus, Ulrich J. Deutsche Tonfilme: Jahrgang 1934. Klaus-Archiv, 1988.
 Rentschler, Eric. The Ministry of Illusion: Nazi Cinema and Its Afterlife. Harvard University Press, 1996.

External links 
 

1934 films
Films of Nazi Germany
German drama films
1934 drama films
1930s German-language films
German black-and-white films
1930s German films
Films directed by Carl Boese